Florent Thamba (born 25 February 1999) is a Congolese college basketball player for the Baylor Bears of the Big 12 Conference.

Early life and high school career
Thamba was born in the Democratic Republic of the Congo and lived in England and France during his childhood before settling in South Africa. At age 16, he moved to the United States to attend Mountain Mission School in Grundy, Virginia, where he played basketball for three seasons. He committed to playing college basketball for Baylor over offers from Illinois, Virginia Tech and Nebraska.

College career
Thamba came off the bench during his first two years at Baylor. As a freshman, he averaged 1.8 points and 2.2 rebounds per game. He averaged 2.3 points and 2.2 rebounds per game as a sophomore. In his junior season, Thamba became a starter for one of the top teams in the nation. He averaged 3.6 points and four rebounds per game, helping Baylor win its first NCAA tournament title. On 26 February 2022, Thamba scored a career-high 18 points in a 80-70 victory against Kansas.

Career statistics

College

|-
| style="text-align:left;"| 2018–19
| style="text-align:left;"| Baylor
| 33 || 0 || 10.0 || .538 || – || .533 || 2.2 || .3 || .2 || .6 || 1.8
|-
| style="text-align:left;"| 2019–20
| style="text-align:left;"| Baylor
| 19 || 0 || 9.1 || .481 || – || .567 || 2.2 || .1 || .1 || .7 || 2.3
|-
| style="text-align:left;"| 2020–21
| style="text-align:left;"| Baylor
| 30 || 30 || 15.0 || .563 || – || .617 || 4.0 || .2 || .2 || .7 || 3.6
|- class="sortbottom"
| style="text-align:center;" colspan="2"| Career
| 82 || 30 || 11.6 || .540 || – || .579 || 2.8 || .2 || .2 || .7 || 2.6

Personal life
Thamba's father, Emmanual, works in customs in the Democratic Republic of the Congo. His older brother, Levy, fatally fell from a hotel balcony in 2014 after consuming a marijuana edible.

References

External links
Baylor Bears bio

1999 births
Living people
Baylor Bears men's basketball players
Democratic Republic of the Congo expatriate basketball people in the United States
Democratic Republic of the Congo men's basketball players
Power forwards (basketball)
Centers (basketball)
Basketball players from Kinshasa
21st-century Democratic Republic of the Congo people